Orthodes is a genus of moths of the family Noctuidae.

Species
 Orthodes adiastola Franclemont, 1976
 Orthodes anoatra Guenée, 1852
 Orthodes bolteri (Smith, 1900)
 Orthodes cachia (Schaus, 1911)
 Orthodes cartagensis (Schaus, 1911)
 Orthodes cracerdota (Dyar, 1913)
 Orthodes curvirena Guenée, 1852
 Orthodes cynica Guenée, 1852
 Orthodes detracta (Walker, 1857) 
 Orthodes dolia (Dyar, 1913)
 Orthodes dormitosa (Dyar, 1922)
 Orthodes enages (Dyar, 1913)
 Orthodes furtiva McDunnough, 1943
 Orthodes goniostigma (Schaus, 1903)
 Orthodes goodelli (Grote, 1875)
 Orthodes infirma Guenée, 1852
 Orthodes jamaicensis (Hampson, 1905)
 Orthodes lanaris (Butler, 1890)
 Orthodes lobata (Hampson, 1905)
 Orthodes lodebar Druce, 1889
 Orthodes loliopopa (Dyar, 1913)
 Orthodes majuscula Herrich-Schäffer, 1868 (syn: Orthodes crenulata (Butler, 1890))
 Orthodes moderata (Walker, 1857)
 Orthodes nocanoca (Dyar, 1919)
 Orthodes noverca (Grote, 1878) (=Orthodes delecta Barnes & McDunnough, 1916, Orthodes vauorbicularis (Smith, 1902) )
 Orthodes oache (Dyar, 1913)
 Orthodes obscura (Smith, 1888)
 Orthodes orbica (Hampson, 1905)
 Orthodes turrialba (Schaus, 1911)
 Orthodes ultimella (Dyar, 1913)
 Orthodes vesquesa (Dyar, 1913)

References
 Natural History Museum Lepidoptera genus database
 Orthodes at funet.fi

Hadeninae